William Keith McDonald (born February 8, 1973) is a former Major League Baseball catcher and right-handed batter. He made his debut with the St. Louis Cardinals in 2000.

On July 4, 2000 McDonald became the third player in St. Louis history to hit a home run in his first major league at-bat. On July 6, he homered in his second at-bat, becoming only the second player in MLB history to hit home runs in each of his first two big league at bats. Bob Nieman, in 1951, is the other. McDonald hit a third home run that year. McDonald has the most home runs of any MLB player not to have had any other hits.

In his first season McDonald batted .429 (3-7), with three homers, five RBI and three runs in six games. He returned the following season as a September call-up, and was hitless in two at-bats.

References

External links
 

1973 births
American baseball players
Cypress Chargers baseball players
Living people
Major League Baseball catchers
Major League Baseball players from Japan
Nashville Sounds players
Sportspeople from Kanagawa Prefecture
St. Louis Cardinals players
Pepperdine Waves baseball players
Arkansas Travelers players
Columbus Clippers players
Iowa Cubs players
Johnson City Cardinals players
Memphis Redbirds players
Oklahoma RedHawks players
Peoria Chiefs players
St. Petersburg Cardinals players
Utah Utes football players
Utah Utes baseball players